CC Andromedae (CC And) is a variable star in the constellation Andromeda. It is a pulsating star of the Delta Scuti type, with an apparent visual magnitude that varies between 9.19 and 9.46 with a periodicity of 3 hours.

The stellar classification of CC Andromedae is F3IV-V, as it shows intermediate characteristics between a subgiant and a main sequence star. The brightness variations are the result of 7 different pulsation modes, most of which are non-radial, making it a suspected Gamma Doradus variable too.

References

Andromeda (constellation)
Andromedae, CC
J00434801+4216557
Durchmusterung objects
003432
Delta Scuti variables
F-type subgiants
F-type main-sequence stars